Somsak Thongsuk (born 9 January 1939) is a Thai sprinter. He competed in the men's 200 metres at the 1964 Summer Olympics.

References

1939 births
Living people
Athletes (track and field) at the 1964 Summer Olympics
Somsak Thongsuk
Somsak Thongsuk
Place of birth missing (living people)
Asian Games medalists in athletics (track and field)
Somsak Thongsuk
Athletes (track and field) at the 1970 Asian Games
Medalists at the 1970 Asian Games
Somsak Thongsuk
Somsak Thongsuk